Wet blanket may refer to: 
Fire blanket, a wet blanket used as a device to put out a fire
Wet Blanket Policy, an animated cartoon
"Wet Blanket", a 1987 song from The Chills' Brave Words